Richard Wills may refer to:

 Richard J. Wills Jr (born 1942), retired bishop of the United Methodist Church
 Rich Wills (born 1945), American politician
 Rick Wills (born 1947), British rock musician